Elisabeth Aguilar López (born 15 October 1976 in Madrid) is a former Spanish women's basketball player, member of the Spanish women's basketball team. After four years at George Washington Colonials, she spent most of her senior career in Spanish clubs (Real Canoe NC, Halcón Viajes Salamanca, Caja Rural Canarias, Ros Casares Valencia and Rivas Ecópolis, with just a couple of stints abroad: 2002 at Utah Starzz and 2012-13 at WBC Spartak Moscow Region. She won five Spanish Leagues , eight Spanish Cups and six medals with the Spanish senior team, retiring as European champion in 2013.

Club career 
Elisa Aguilar started playing at home town of Madrid, at Real Canoe NC youth levels, making her debut in the top tier of the Spanish League with the senior team at 16. She played in several Spanish clubs from 1998 to 2001, when she moved to the United States to complete a college degree and at the same time play for the George Washington Colonials team. She continued most of her career in Europe (Spain, Russia), also playing for the Utah Starzz in 2002.

National team 

She made her debut with Spain women's national basketball team at the age of 20. She played with the senior team for 17 years, from 1996 to 2013. She is one of the most capped players with a total of 222 caps and 5.3 PPG.  She retired from the national team at the age of 36 with the gold medal at the 2013 Eurobasket. She participated in two Olympic Games (Athens 2004, Beijing 2008), three World Championships and seven European Championships:

 1993 FIBA Europe Under-16 Championship for Women (youth)
 1994 FIBA Europe Under-18 Championship for Women (youth)
5th 1997 Eurobasket
5th 1998 World Championship 
 2001 Eurobasket
6th 2004 Summer Olympics
 2005 Eurobasket
8th 2006 World Championship
 2007 Eurobasket
5th 2008 Summer Olympics
 2009 Eurobasket
 2010 World Championship
9th 2011 Eurobasket
  2013 Eurobasket

References

1976 births
Living people
Basketball players from Madrid
Spanish women's basketball players
Olympic basketball players of Spain
Basketball players at the 2004 Summer Olympics
Basketball players at the 2008 Summer Olympics
Point guards